Artur Śliwiński (17 August 1877 – 16 January 1953) is the 8th Prime Minister of Poland from 28 June – 7 July 1922. In 1915 he had presided over the National Central Committee, which sought Polish independence from partitioning powers.

1877 births
1953 deaths
People from Kutno County
People from Warsaw Governorate
Polish Socialist Party – Revolutionary Faction politicians
Polish Socialist Party politicians
Nonpartisan Bloc for Cooperation with the Government politicians
Prime Ministers of Poland
Senators of the Second Polish Republic (1935–1938)
Senators of the Second Polish Republic (1938–1939)
Polish Freemasons
20th-century Polish historians
Polish male non-fiction writers
Golden Laurel of the Polish Academy of Literature
Burials at Powązki Cemetery